Alawa (Galawa) is a moribund Indigenous Australian language spoken by the Alawa people of the Northern Territory. In 1991, there were reportedly 18 remaining speakers and 4 semi-speakers.

Phonology

Consonants
Alawa has a typical consonant inventory for an Indigenous Australian language, with five contrastive places of articulation, multiple lateral consonants, and no voicing contrast among the stops.

Note: there are no standardised IPA symbols for alveopalatal stops.

Vowels
The vowel system of Alawa is made up of four vowel phonemes: the high front vowel /i/, the high back vowel /u/, the mid front vowel /e/, and the low central vowel /a/.

There are no rounding contrasts or length contrasts in this language.

Vocabulary
Capell (1942) lists the following basic vocabulary items:

{| class="wikitable sortable"
! gloss !! Alawa
|-
| man || lilmi
|-
| woman || girija
|-
| head || guɽuguɽu
|-
| eye || gulur
|-
| nose || gujumur
|-
| mouth || ŋaːndal
|-
| tongue || djeːjälŋ
|-
| stomach || gundjäl
|-
| bone || galawa
|-
| blood || ŋulidji
|-
| kangaroo || girimbọ
|-
| opossum || gudjaɳi
|-
| emu || djinaliri
|-
| crow || waŋgunaji
|-
| fly || wuɳɖil
|-
| sun || marawaɭbaɭ
|-
| moon || aɖaŋari
|-
| fire || wubu
|-
| smoke || guŋuŋu
|-
| water || ŋọgọ
|}

See also

References

External links 

 Bibliography of Alawa language and people resources, at the Australian Institute of Aboriginal and Torres Strait Islander Studies

Endangered indigenous Australian languages in the Northern Territory
Mangarrayi–Maran languages